Fawaz Yahya al-Rabeiee (1979 – 1 October 2006) was an al-Qaeda terrorist, sentenced to death in 2004 by a Yemeni court for his part in the 2002 attack on the French tanker Limburg. Al-Rabeiee escaped custody in February 2006, with 22 other inmates, but was killed 1 October 2006 in San‘a’, along with another al-Qaeda suspect identified as Mohammed Daylami.

Al-Rabeii was a Yemeni national although born in Saudi Arabia. He became wanted in 2002, by the United States Department of Justice's FBI, which was then seeking information about his identity and whereabouts. In early 2002, he had been named as the cell leader in a suspected Yemen plot, for which he became listed on the FBI's third major "wanted" list, now known as the FBI Seeking Information – War on Terrorism list.

Al-Rabeiee was considered to be the "ring leader" of his Yemen terrorist cell. In 2002, he had been identified by the FBI as traveling on Yemeni passport 00452004. His identified aliases included Fawaz Yahia Hassan Aribii, Fawaz al-Rubai, Fawaz Yehia Hassan al-Rabie, Fawaz Yahya Hasan al-Rabi'i, Fawaz Yahya al-Ribi (al-Ruba'i, al-Rabia'i, al-Rabi'i), Forqan al-Tajiki, Furqan al-Tajiki, Furgan al-Tajiki, Furqan the Chechen, Faris al-Baraq, Sa'id Musharraf, and Salem al-Farhan. "Furqan al-Tajiki" is the addressee of a letter, found in Afghanistan, which appears to have been written by his brother Salman Yahya Hassan Mohammed Rabeii.

12 February 2002 Yemeni terror alert 
On 11 February 2002, al-Rabeei was named in a suspected Yemen plot, for which he was among 17 suspected terrorists added to the FBI's third major "wanted" list, the "Seeking Information" list.

By February 2003, the FBI removed 6 suspects already jailed rearranged its wanted lists. Al-Rabeei was one of the remaining eleven Yemen plot suspects. By 2006, al-Rabeei had been archived and removed from the FBI's current main wanted page, and were no longer included in the official count of suspects.

Whether foiled, aborted, or merely incorrect specific intelligence, the 12 February 2002 attack never occurred. However, other attacks and plots in Yemen which involved the al-Rabeei cell soon followed.

2002 attacks and plots
In al-Rabeei's later trial, charges included the October 2002 bombing of the Limburg, a French oil tanker, and a plot to kill the United States Ambassador in Yemen.

Two suicide bombers rammed an explosive-laden boat into the oil tanker, killing a Bulgarian crew member and spilling 90,000 barrels of oil into the Gulf of Aden. This operation was very similar to the attack on the American destroyer USS Cole two years earlier.  Saudi born Abdulraheem al-Nashiri, prime suspect of the USS Cole bombing (currently in the US custody), paid $40,000 to fund the Limburg attack. With that money, the former Al Qaida leader Abu Ali al-Harithi bought the explosives and transported them from his house in Shabwa to Mukalla in Hadramut. Later in 2002, Al-Harithi was killed by the CIA with a missile fired from a Predator drone.

Al-Rabeiee's conviction also included the bombing of civil aviation authority building in April 2002 and the attack on a helicopter carrying Hunt Oil Co. employees in November 2002. (See attacks on civilian targets in Yemen).

By 2 February 2003, the FBI rearranged its entire wanted lists on its web site, into the current configuration. Al-Rabeiee was one of the remaining eleven Yemen plot suspects archived to a linked page titled, "February 2002, Seeking Information Alert". Around this time the FBI also changed the name of the list, to the FBI "Seeking Information – War on Terrorism", to distinguish it from its other wanted list of "Seeking Information," which the FBI already uses for ordinary fugitives, those who are not terrorists.

Capture and trial

After al-Rabeei was caught, the trial began, on 29 May 2004 and centered on the October 2002 bombing of the Limburg.

On 10 July 2004, during a court hearing, several of the accused threatened the prosecutor by stating that they would cut off his legs.

Fawaz al-Rabeiee was sentenced to death for the Limburg attack. He was also fined $100,000 to compensate for the aviation building damages.

Seven others were sentenced to 10 years in prison. Five of the militants — Ibraheem Mohammed al-Huwaidi, Aref Saleh Ali Mujali, Mohammed Abdullah al-Dailami, Abdulghani Ali Hussein Kaifan, and Kasem Yahia al-Raimee — were sentenced to five years in prison. They were found guilty of plotting attacks against the US, French, UK, Cuban and German embassies, and plotting to assassinate the former U.S. Ambassador to Yemen. One of the 15 accused was sentenced to death for killing a Yemeni police officer.

Fayez al-Hajoury, a lawyer who represented Fawzi Halabi, a defendant who received a 10 years sentence, described the verdicts as "null and void" and stated that the work of the defense attorneys was obstructed by authorities. Saleh Majali, the father of the man sentenced to death, angrily stated the whole trial was a "sham", with no respect for human rights. The father of defendant Abdulkareem Kaifan claimed the verdict had been decided from the start and the whole trial was a "decoration" to pass the verdict. The defendants vowed to appeal their verdicts and sentences.

Mass escape from Yemen

On 3 February 2006, 23 people, 12 of them al-Qaeda members, escaped from a Yemeni jail in San'a, according to a BBC report. Al-Rabeiee was among the group, which reportedly escaped by digging a tunnel, 140 metres, which took them to a nearby mosque.

However, none of the 17 Yemen plot suspects from the 2002 terror alert appeared again among the newly listed FBI "wanted" list names in relation to the Yemen escape of 2006.

References

1979 births
2006 deaths
Yemeni al-Qaeda members
Deaths by firearm in Yemen
Yemeni escapees
Escapees from Yemeni detention
Yemeni prisoners sentenced to death
Prisoners sentenced to death by Yemen
People shot dead by law enforcement officers